Sredno Egri is a village in the Bitola Municipality of North Macedonia. It used to be part of the former municipality of Bistrica.

Demographics
According to the 2002 census, the village had a total of 299 inhabitants. Ethnic groups in the village include:

Macedonians 299

References

External links
 Visit Macedonia

Villages in Bitola Municipality